Last Girl Standing is a 2015 American psychological horror film written and directed by Benjamin R. Moody. It stars Akasha Villalobos, Danielle Evon Ploeger, and Brian Villalobos.

Plot 
Camryn survives an attack from a homicidal killer wearing a deer mask, later dubbed The Hunter, which claims the lives of her friends. Four years later, she is suffering from post-traumatic stress disorder, and trying to live a quiet life – working in a laundromat, and avoiding contact with other people. That changes when Nick starts a job at the laundromat, and Camryn begins to believe that someone is stalking her again. She decides to keep an eye on Nick and his friends to make sure that history won't repeat itself.

Cast 

 Akasha Villalobos as Camryn 
 Danielle Evon Ploeger as Danielle
 Brian Villalobos as Nick
 JD Carrera as Tyler
 Ryan Hamilton as Griffin
 Kelsey Pribilski as Maelyn
 Laura Ray as Hannah
 Jason Vines as The Hunter

Production 
Last Girl Standing was produced in Austin, Texas, and was funded via Kickstarter. It was written and directed by Benjamin R. Moody, and produced by his wife Rachel Moody.

Release 
The film screened its world premiere at Film4 FrightFest in the United Kingdom on August 31, 2015. Its American premiere was on October 17, 2015 at the Eerie Horror Fest.

Reception 
Last Girl Standing received mixed to positive reviews from critics. Dread Central enthusiastically declares, "Every year at Texas Frightmare Weekend there’s one movie that screens that stands above the others... In 2016 that movie is Last Girl Standing." Horrornews.net raves that the film "...was a great watch, and it comes highly recommended." Bloody Disgustings review was more mixed, noting that "A lot of Last Girl Standing works, but it feels like it’s all setup and once it finally does reveal its true nature, it ends." Similarly, Scream Magazine remarks, "This may have a great concept and a realistic execution, but there is a certain amount of entertainment value missing", adding "Last Girl Standing is definitely worth a watch..." Horror Freak News was negative in it assessment of the film, winding up in its review with "it's a foregone conclusion that it can be labeled "adequately skip-worthy"."

References

External links 
 
 

2015 films
2015 horror films
American psychological horror films
American independent films
2010s English-language films
2010s American films